The 2019–20 Major Arena Soccer League 2 season was the third season for the league also known as M2. The regular season started on December 1, 2019, and ended on March 13, 2020 due to the COVID-19 pandemic.

The Major Arena Soccer League signed an agreement with Arena Soccer Group, LLC (ASG) to take over the management of M2 on October 24, 2019. ASG brought over FC Amarillo Bombers and Wichita Falls Flyers FC from its former league, the US Arena Professional Soccer League, to join M2.

Changes from 2018–19
Expansion
FC Amarillo Bombers
Austin Power FC
Chihuahua Savage
Wichita Wings
Wichita Falls Flyers FC

Provisional Schedule
Muskegon Risers

On hiatus
Las Vegas Knights

Folded / left
Arizona Lightning
Chicago Mustangs
Cincinnati Swerve
Cuervos de Juarez
New Mexico Elite
Ontario Fury II
Rochester Lancers
San Diego Sockers 2
Stockton Rush
Waza Flo

Standings
As of March 13, 2020

(Bold) Division Winner

References

External links
 MASL2 official website

Major Arena Soccer League
 
Major Arena Soccer League